Ariopsis is the scientific name of two genera of organisms and may refer to:

Ariopsis (fish), a genus of fishes in the family Ariidae
Ariopsis (plant), a genus of plants in the family Araceae